The Rural Municipality of Willow Creek No. 458 is a rural municipality (RM) in the Canadian province of Saskatchewan within Census Division No. 14 and  Division No. 4.

History 
The RM of Willow Creek No. 458 incorporated as a rural municipality on December 9, 1912.

Geography

Communities and localities 
The following unincorporated communities are within the RM.

Organized hamlets
 Fairy Glen
 Gronlid

Localities
 Brooksby
 Edenbridge
 Irvington
 Ratner
 Thaxted
 Whittome

Demographics 

Attractions 
 Beth Israel Synagogue
 Fort a la Corne Provincial Forest
 Melfort & District Museum
 Star City Heritage Museum
 Tisdale & District Museum
 Wapiti Valley Regional Park
 Wapiti Provincial Recreation Site

Government 
The RM of Willow Creek No. 458 is governed by an elected municipal council and an appointed administrator that meets on the second Wednesday of every month. The reeve of the RM is Gordon Garinger while its administrator is Vicki Baptist. The RM's office is located in Brooksby.

Transportation 
 Saskatchewan Highway 6
 Saskatchewan Highway 335
 Saskatchewan Highway 681
 Saskatchewan Highway 789
 Melfort Airport
 Tisdale Airport

See also 
List of rural municipalities in Saskatchewan

References 

Willow Creek
Division No. 14, Saskatchewan